Ganapavaram may refer to:

Ganapavaram, Guntur district, a village in Guntur district, Andhra Pradesh, India
Ganapavaram, Prakasam district, a village in Prakasam district, Andhra Pradesh, India
Ganapavaram, Eluru district, a village in Eluru district, Andhra Pradesh, India
 Ganapavaram mandal, one of the 28 mandals in Eluru district of the Indian state of Andhra Pradesh